is a Japanese rugby union player who plays as a Hooker. He currently plays for Suntory Sungoliath in Japan's domestic Top League.

International
Japan head coach Jamie Joseph has named Kosuke Horikoshi in a 52-man training squad ahead of British and Irish Lions test.

References

External links
itsrugby.co.uk Profile

1995 births
Living people
People from Gunma Prefecture
Sportspeople from Gunma Prefecture
Japanese rugby union players
Japan international rugby union players
Rugby union hookers
Tokyo Sungoliath players
21st-century Japanese people